Sadam Mangal (born 8 April 1998) is an Afghan cricketer. He made his first-class debut for Mis Ainak Region in the 2017–18 Ahmad Shah Abdali 4-day Tournament on 26 October 2017. He made his List A debut for Mis Ainak Region in the 2019 Ghazi Amanullah Khan Regional One Day Tournament on 11 September 2019.

References

External links
 

1998 births
Living people
Afghan cricketers
Mis Ainak Knights cricketers
Place of birth missing (living people)